Sin City is a nickname that may be applied to an urban area (a city or part of) that caters to various vices. These vices may be legal (depending on area) or illegal activities which are tolerated.

Examples of vices include sex-related services (prostitution, strip clubs, sex shops, etc.), gambling (casinos, betting shops, etc.), or drug use (alcohol, marijuana, etc. consumption), and even excessive organized crime and gang activity. If the city is known for prostitution, it is often called a red-light district, as in Amsterdam, Netherlands.

Sin Cities in the world
Cities or areas that have this reputation include:

Africa
 Morocco
 Marrakesh (prostitution, gambling, drinking, clubbing)

Asia
 Azerbaijan
 Baku (political corruption, clubbing, drinking, organized crime, bribery, police corruption, prostitution)
 Bahrain
 Manama (drinking, clubs, prostitution)
 China
 Dongguan (prostitution)
 Macau (gambling, organized crime, clubbing, prostitution, drinking)
 Israel
 Tel Aviv (strip clubs, drinking, clubbing, parties)
 Lebanon
 Beirut (prostitution, strip clubs, cabarets, drugs, drinking, clubbing).
 Philippines
 Angeles City (prostitution, gambling, drinking, clubbing)
 Thailand
 Bangkok (prostitution, strip clubs, sex shows, scams, BDSM, brothels, massage parlors, cabarets, go-go bars, drugs, drinking, clubbing)
 Pattaya (prostitution, strip clubs, sex shows, BDSM, brothels, massage parlors, cabarets, go-go bars, drugs, drinking, clubbing)

Europe
 Cyprus
 Ayia Napa (drugs, drinking, clubbing)
 Czech Republic
 Prague (prostitution, organized crime, police corruption, clubbing, strip clubs, brothels)
 The Netherlands
 Amsterdam (prostitution, brothels, strip clubs, sex shops, sex shows, marijuana consumption)
 Russia 
 Moscow (organized crime, gangs, clubbing, drinking, drugs, police corruption, political corruption, prostitution, strip clubs)
 Spain
 Ibiza (clubbing, drugs)
 Malta
 Paceville
 United Kingdom 
 Liverpool, England
 Soho, London, England

North America

 Canada
 Montreal became well known as one of North America's "sin cities" with unparalleled nightlife, a reputation it still holds today. In part, its bustling nightlife is attributed to its relatively late "last call" (3 a.m.), a large university population, the drinking age of 18, and the excellent public transportation system combines with other aspects of the Montreal culture to make the city's nightlife unique. The diversity of the clubs in Montreal attests to the popularity of its nightlife, with night clubs, pubs, bars and singing bars ("boîte à chanson"), Latin clubs, African clubs, jazz clubs, lounges, after-hours houses, and strip clubs all attracting different types of customers.

 Mexico
 Tijuana (drugs, prostitution, drinking, police corruption, strip clubs)
 United States
 Alabama
 Phenix City
 California 
 Los Angeles and its Hollywood district (bank robberies, porn industry, sex-publishing industries, tabloids, prostitution (Sunset & Vine); also includes police corruption, nightclubs, drugs, drinking, strip clubs, gangs.)
 San Francisco (organized crime, gangs, drugs, and prostitution)
 Florida
 Miami (gangs, organized crime, drug trafficking, prostitution, drinking, political and police corruption, scams, strip clubs)
 Illinois
 Chicago (organized crime, political and police corruption)
 Kentucky
 Newport is the first city within North America to be coined the title due to its role in prostitution, gambling, gangs, gunplay, racketeering, and many others.
 Nevada
 Las Vegas (gambling, bookmaking, easy marriage, easy divorce, organized crime, prostitution [however, prostitution is illegal in Las Vegas and Clark County], strip clubs, cabarets, clubbing, 24-hour liquor sales [as in all of Nevada]; quote: "What happens in Vegas, stays in Vegas."). In former days it was known also for organized crime and police and political corruption.
 Reno; (gambling, drinking, strip clubs, clubbing, easy marriage, easy divorce, prostitution [however, prostitution is illegal in Reno and Washoe County] 24-hour liquor sales [as in all of Nevada]).
 New Jersey
 Atlantic City (gambling, bookmaking, organized crime, drinking, prostitution, clubbing, and strip clubs) (Known as the World Famous Playground) (In the old days it was known also for organized crime, police corruption, and political corruption).
 New York
 New York City formerly known for out of control crime, Times Square's sex shops and prostitution and barely hidden drug trade and citywide gangs, including many Mob families and police and political corruption.

South America
 Brazil
 Rio de Janeiro (male & female prostitution, scams, notorious prison system, police corruption, political corruption, drinking, drugs, favelas, gangs, clubbing)
 Colombia
 Medellin (police corruption, prostitution, drinking, drugs, gangs, clubbing)
 Venezuela
 Caracas (scams, prison system corruption, police corruption, political corruption, prostitution, organized crime, drinking, drugs, slums, gangs, robbery, clubbing, drug trafficking, violence)

Oceania
 Australia
 Kings Cross, New South Wales – A historically notorious inner-city of Sydney, although this reputation is outdated with the imposition of new lockout laws in February 2014 changing the character of the area dramatically, and arguably eliminating the only "sin city" in Australia. (Prostitution, brothels, gambling (illegal and legal), organized crime, bikie gangs (to an extent), police corruption, drugs, strip clubs, drinking, excessive, drunken and random violence.)
 New Zealand
 Auckland

Former Sin Cities

Asia
 China
 Shanghai – 1920s and 1930s (organized crime, opium dens, gambling, police corruption, political corruption, prostitution)

Europe
 Weimar Republic
 Berlin – 1920s and early 1930s (prostitution, numerous cabarets, decadence in general)
 Monto, Dublin – (prostitution, crime)

North America
 Canada
 Montreal, Quebec, which earned a reputation for vice through American tourists fleeing the prohibition laws.
 United States
 Alabama
 Phenix City, was notorious during the 1940s and 1950s for being a haven for organized crime, prostitution, and gambling. Many of its customers came from the United States Army training center at Fort Benning, Georgia.
 Florida
 Miami, during the 1970s and 1980s (organized crime, drug trafficking, gangs, strip clubs, clubbing, drinking, police corruption, prostitution, brothels and political corruption)
 Illinois
 Chicago in the 1920s to 1930s (prostitution, bootlegging, cabarets, speakeasies, illegal gambling, bank robberies, police corruption, political corruption, organized crime, and gang activity)
 Indiana
 Michigan City was considered Sin City in the 1980-1990s, with the proliferation of massage parlors.
 Terre Haute was labeled Sin City by the monthly magazine Stag in 1955. (reputation for being "wide open", with gambling and a well-developed "red light district"). Now the federal death row is in Terre Haute at the Terre Haute Federal Correctional Complex.
 Kentucky
 Covington, Kentucky (brothels, gambling, organized crime)
 Newport, Kentucky (brothels, gambling, organized crime)
 Massachusetts
 Boston, Massachusetts, from the early-1960s to the early-1990s recession years, known for the Scollay Square burlesque district and the Combat Zone adult entertainment district, Suffolk Downs on the Revere city line, notorious housing projects, the largest policy racket in the United States, loan shark offices at Bennington and Brooks streets in the East Boston district, and rowdy Irish pubs aligned along West Broadway and Dorchester streets in the South Boston district.
 Lynn, Massachusetts, during the 1960s, 1970s, and 1980s,  known for its famous rhyme, "Lynn, Lynn, the city of sin, you never come out the way you go in.
 Louisiana
 New Orleans from 1897 through 1917, Storyville district (prostitution, brothels, gambling, and speakeasies)
 New York
 New York City in the mid to late 19th Century and 20th century (prostitution, brothels, illegal gambling, notorious slums, pickpocketing,  police corruption, political corruption, drugs, gangs, organized crime), Times Square from the mid-1960s until circa 1990 (prostitution, pornography, go-go bars, sex shops, sex shows, squeegee men, strip clubs, clubbing, drugs, organized crime)
 Utica, in the 1930s through the 1950s for the extent of its corruption and control from political machines, presence of organized crime.
 Texas
 Galveston in the 1920s to 1957 (prostitution, organized crime, gambling, speakeasies, drinking, police corruption, political corruption)

See also
 Grand Theft Auto: Vice City
 Sodom and Gomorrah
 Red-light district
 Sin City (film)
 Gotham City

References

External links
 Top 10: Sin Cities (at AskMen)

Drinking culture
Drug culture
English-language idioms
Gambling terminology
Gangs
Sin city
Organized crime terminology
Sex industry